A work train or departmental train (engineering train in the UK) is one or more rail cars intended for internal non-revenue use by the railroad's operator.  Work trains serve functions such as track maintenance, maintenance of way, revenue collection, system cleanup and waste removal, heavy duty hauling, and crew member transport.

Types of work trains 
 Locomotives and cab units
 Track maintenance equipment (track geometry cars, ballast regulators, ballast tamper cars, ballast cleaners, stoneblowers, rail grinders, Sperry rail cars, ballast loaders/removers, hopper cars, continuous welded rail handlers, weld cars, track renewal train)
 Flood cleanup cars (reach cars, pump cars, hose cars)
 Snow removal cars
 Rail inspection cars
 Refuse motor cars
 De-icer cars
 Rail adhesion cars
 Crane cars
 Dump cars
 Flatbed cars
 Signal supply cars
 Tanker cars
 Vacuum cars
 Revenue collection cars
 Rider cars
 Sweeper Cleaner
 Rail bridge inspection
 Weed spray rail
 Bush cutter rail
 Excavator rail

Gallery

See also 
 List of railway vehicles
 Non-revenue cars
 Plasser & Theurer
 Rail inspection
 Track renewal train

Maintenance of way equipment
Railcars